Pseudopompilus is a small genus of spider wasps in the subfamily Pompilinae and the tribe Psammoderini. which are found in southern Europe, the Middle East and southern Africa.

Species
There are five species currently recognised in Pseudopompilus:

Pseudopompilus antonini Costa, 1887
Pseudopompilus funereus (Arnold, 1936) - Namibia, Zimbabwe
Pseudopompilus humboldti  (Dahlbom, 1845) - Italy, Greece, Turkey, Jordan, Israel, Egypt, Turkmenistan, Libya
Pseudopompilus hyalinipennis (Arnold, 1935) - South Africa
Pseudopompilus lacteipennis (Arnold, 1936) - South Africa

References

Pompilinae
Hymenoptera genera
Taxa named by Achille Costa